The Ministry of Defence and Veterans Affairs may refer to:

 Ministry of Defence and Veterans Affairs (South Sudan)
 Ministry of Defence and Veterans Affairs (Uganda)

See also 
 Ministry of defence